Didrik Hegermann Grønvold (16 December 1855 – 24 March 1928) was a Norwegian educator and writer.

He was born in Bergen as a son of vicar Christian August Grønvold (1810–1889), and was a brother of painters Bernt and Marcus Grønvold and third cousin of Hans Aimar Mow Grønvold. He spent most of his career as an educator in Bergen and Hamar, and was also a writer. His best novel was Storstadsgutter (1885).

References

1855 births
1928 deaths
Schoolteachers from Bergen
19th-century Norwegian novelists
20th-century Norwegian novelists
Writers from Bergen